FO&O is the second studio album by Swedish boy band FO&O. It was released in Sweden by The Artist House on 12 May 2017. The album peaked at number 35 on the Swedish Albums Chart.

Singles
"Gotta Thing About You" was released as the lead single from the album on 26 February 2017. The song peaked at number 7 on the Swedish Singles Chart. It took part in Melodifestivalen 2017, and qualified for the Final; it finished in 8th place. "So So Good" was released as the second single from the album on 5 May 2017.

Track listing

Charts

Release history

References

2017 albums
FO&O albums